Yulen (or Julen) Isaakovych Uralov (born 23 November 1924) is a Soviet Jewish Olympic fencer.

Biography
Uralov was born in Kiev, Ukraine. He graduated from the Military Institute of Physical Culture.  

His club was SKA Leningrad. He was named a Merited Master of Sport of the USSR in 1949. He was the USSR foil champion in 1952 and 1953, a silver medal winner in 1955, and a bronze medal winner in 1949. 

Uralov competed in the individual and team foil events at the 1952 Summer Olympics in Helsinki, Finland, at the age of 27. 

After his competitive career concluded, Uralov coached the Ukrainian national team. He has lived in Israel since the early 1990s.

See also
List of select Jewish fencers

References

External links
 

1924 births
Living people
Russian male foil fencers
Ukrainian male foil fencers
Soviet male foil fencers
Olympic fencers of the Soviet Union
Fencers at the 1952 Summer Olympics
Sportspeople from Kyiv
Soviet Jews
Ukrainian Jews
Jewish male foil fencers
Honoured Masters of Sport of the USSR